Anumeta spilota is a moth of the family Erebidae first described by Nikolay Grigoryevich Erschoff in 1874. It is found from the western parts of the Sahara to the Sinai, Israel, central Asia, Pakistan and India.

There is probably one generation per year. Adults are on wing from March to May.

Subspecies
Anumeta spilota spilota
Anumeta spilota harterti
Anumeta spilota mugshinensis

References

External links

Image

Toxocampina
Moths of Asia
Moths of Africa
Moths described in 1874